The Beaver Opera House, at 55 E. Center St. in Beaver, Utah, was listed on the National Register of Historic Places in 1982.

It originally had capacity for 1,000 seated persons.

It was designed and built by architects Liljenberg and Maeser, for $20,000.

It is built of tuff, the pink stone that is used in many other Beaver buildings.

It served as a "center for community and church affairs" and as a theatre for about two decades.

Performers included Walter Christensen, Ralph Cloninger, Luke Gosgrave, and Shelby Roach.

From 1929 to c.1955, it was used for offices and storage by the Utah National Guard.

References

External links
Beaver Opera House, at UtahTheaters.info, lists additional sources: "Chapter 6 Entrance into the Twentieth Century 1900-1920", A History of Beaver County, Martha Sonntag Bradley;  "Beaver Opera House Promotors Thought Big", The History Blazer, June 1996, Utah State History CD-ROM; The Weekly Press, 20 November 1914.

Opera houses
National Register of Historic Places in Beaver County, Utah